John H. Crowe III is a game designer who has worked primarily on role-playing games.

Career
John H. Crowe III was one of the early staff members at Pagan Publishing. Crowe contributed Call of Cthulhu weapons statistics to the magazine The Unspeakable Oath which were later included in The Weapons Compendium (1993) along with new weapons. When Pagan Publishing moved to Seattle, Dennis Detwiller, Brian Appleton and Crowe all agreed to move to Seattle with John Scott Tynes. Pagan published two supplements over the next year after moving, Walker in the Wastes (1994) and Coming Full Circle (1995), both by Crowe. Crowe contributed to Mortal Coils in 1998 and remained involved as a member of the editorial staff. By 2008, Crowe and Appleton published the Call of Cthulhu books Final Flight (2008) and The Mysteries of Mesoamerica through Pagan. Crowe also wrote The Realm of Shadows (1997) and Bumps in the Night (2011).

References

External links
 

Living people
Role-playing game designers
Year of birth missing (living people)